The Malgaç Raid, was a raid conducted by Yörük Ali Efe and his men on 16 June 1919. The target of the raid was the Malgaç railway bridge, which was used by the Greeks to transport military equipment to Nazilli and beyond. It was one of the first organized civil resistance attacks against the invading Greek forces in western Anatolia.

Prelude 
The bridge was part of the Izmir-Aydın railway, which was the first railway built in the Ottoman Empire. The Malgaç bridge was located between Sultanhisar and Atça, built above the Malgaç stream.

Raid 
The bridge was guarded by 20 heavily armed Greek soldiers, supported with machine guns. In the night of 15–16 June, the Turks advanced from Donduran and crossed the Büyük Menderes River with rafts at 02:00 am. During the crossing they were divided into two groups, each group contained 30 men. When they finally reached the Malgaç bridge, they surrounded it by advancing in the cornfields. Simultaneously, some of the men climbed on the telephone poles and cut off the phone lines to prevent the calling of Greek reinforcements. They attacked the bridge from three sides, surprising the Greek guards and killing all of them.  The bridge was destroyed by placing dynamite at the bridge piers. Woken up by the explosion and loud gunfire, Greek soldiers from the nearby headquarter tried to reach for help but they were hold off. After inflicting some casualties on the reinforcements, the Turkish forces retreated. The attack lasted several hours and the Greek troops had suffered over 20 killed and the Turks had only one wounded.

Result 
The Turks had captured some weapons and ammunition. As a result of the destruction of the bridge and the railway, the Greeks could not use the railway to transport equipment on the Aydın-Nazilli route for a considerable time.

References

Sources
YORUK ALI EFE AND MALGAC SURPRISE ATTACK Sultanhisar Municipality
Çine Kuvayı Milliye Müzesi, Yaşar Aksoy, 06.07.2008 (Article about the Malgaç Raid)
Malgaç Baskını'nın 93. Yıldönümü (93rd anniversary of the Malgaç Raid) haberler.com

Battles of the Greco-Turkish War (1919–1922)
History of Aydın Province
Aidin Vilayet
1919 in the Ottoman Empire
1919 in Greece
Conflicts in 1919
Kuva-yi Milliye
June 1919 events